General Miles was a steamship constructed in 1882. General Miles may also refer to:

Charles Miles (general) (1884–1958), Australian Army lieutenant general
Eric Miles (1891–1977), British Army major general
Herbert Miles (1850–1926), British Army lieutenant general
Nelson A. Miles (1839–1925), U.S. Army lieutenant general
Philip Miles (Indian Army officer) (1864–1948), British Indian Army brigadier general
Sherman Miles (1882–1966), U.S. Army major general